Seth Anderson may refer to:

 Seth Anderson, American musician with the group Love Arcade
 Seth Anderson (One Life to Live), character on the television soap opera One Life to Live
 Seth Anderson, character in the episode "I've Got You Under My Skin" of the series Angel